The  is a handheld game console produced by Nintendo, released globally across 2004 and 2005. The DS, an initialism for "Developers' System" or "Dual Screen", introduced distinctive new features to handheld games: two LCD screens working in tandem (the bottom one being a touchscreen), a built-in microphone and support for wireless connectivity. Both screens are encompassed within a clamshell design similar to the Game Boy Advance SP. The Nintendo DS also features the ability for multiple DS consoles to directly interact with each other over Wi-Fi within a short range without the need to connect to an existing wireless network. Alternatively, they could interact online using the now-defunct Nintendo Wi-Fi Connection service. Its main competitor was Sony's PlayStation Portable during the seventh generation of video game consoles.

Prior to its release, the Nintendo DS was marketed as an experimental "third pillar" in Nintendo's console lineup, meant to complement the Game Boy Advance family and GameCube. However, backward compatibility with Game Boy Advance titles and strong sales ultimately established it as the successor to the Game Boy series. On March 2, 2006, Nintendo launched the Nintendo DS Lite, a slimmer and lighter redesign of the original Nintendo DS with brighter screens and a longer lasting battery. On November 1, 2008, Nintendo released the Nintendo DSi, another redesign with several hardware improvements and new features, although it lost backwards compatibility for Game Boy Advance titles and a few DS games that used the GBA slot. On November 21, 2009, Nintendo released the Nintendo DSi XL, a larger version of the DSi.

All Nintendo DS models combined have sold 154.02 million units, making it the best-selling Nintendo system, the best-selling handheld game console to date, and the second best-selling video game console of all time, overall, behind Sony's PlayStation 2. The Nintendo DS was succeeded by the Nintendo 3DS in February 2011.

History

Development 
Development on the Nintendo DS began around mid-2002, following an original idea from former Nintendo president Hiroshi Yamauchi about a dual-screened console. On November 13, 2003, Nintendo announced that it would be releasing a new game product in 2004. The company did not provide many details, but stated it would not succeed the Game Boy Advance or GameCube. On January 20, 2004, the console was announced under the codename "Nintendo DS". Nintendo released only a few details at that time, saying that the console would have two separate, 3-inch TFT LCD display panels, separate processors, and up to 1 gigabit (128MB) of semiconductor memory. Current Nintendo president at the time, Satoru Iwata, said, "We have developed Nintendo DS based upon a completely different concept from existing game devices in order to provide players with a unique entertainment experience for the 21st century." He also expressed optimism that the DS would help put Nintendo back at the forefront of innovation and move away from the conservative image that has been described about the company in years past. In March 2004, a document containing most of the console's technical specifications was leaked, also revealing its internal development name, "Nitro". In May 2004, the console was shown in prototype form at E3 2004, still under the name "Nintendo DS". On July 28, 2004, Nintendo revealed a new design that was described as "sleeker and more elegant" than the one shown at E3 and announced Nintendo DS as the device's official name. Following lukewarm GameCube sales, Hiroshi Yamauchi stressed the importance of its success to the company's future, making a statement which can be translated from Japanese as, "If the DS succeeds, we will rise to heaven, but if it fails we will sink to hell."

Launch 
President Iwata referred to Nintendo DS as "Nintendo's first hardware launch in support of the basic strategy 'Gaming Population Expansion because the touch-based device "allows users to play intuitively". On September 20, 2004, Nintendo announced that the Nintendo DS would be released in North America on November 21, 2004, for US$149.99. It was set to release on December 2, 2004, in Japan for JP¥15,000; on February 24, 2005, in Australia for A$199.95; and on March 11, 2005, in Europe for €149.99 (£99.99 in the United Kingdom). The console was released in North America with a midnight launch event at Universal CityWalk EB Games in Los Angeles, California. The console was launched quietly in Japan compared to the North America launch; one source cited the cold weather as the reason.

North America and Japan
The Nintendo DS was launched in North America for US$149.99 on November 21, 2004; in Japan for JP¥15,000 on December 2 in the color "Titanium". Well over three million preorders were taken in North America and Japan; preorders at online stores were launched on November 3 and ended the same day as merchants had already sold their allotment. Initially, Nintendo planned to deliver one million units combined at the North American and Japanese launches; when it saw the preorder numbers, it brought another factory online to ramp up production. Nintendo originally slated 300,000 units for the U.S. debut; 550,000 were shipped, and just over 500,000 of those sold through in the first week. Later in 2005, the manufacturer suggested retail price for the Nintendo DS was dropped to US$129.99.

Both launches proved to be successful, but Nintendo chose to release the DS in North America prior to Japan, a first for a hardware launch from the Kyoto-based company. This choice was made to get the DS out for the largest shopping day of the year in the U.S. (the day after Thanksgiving, also known as "Black Friday"). Perhaps partly due to the release date, the DS met unexpectedly high demand in the United States, selling 1 million units by December 21, 2004. By the end of December, the total number shipped worldwide was 2.8 million, about 800,000 more than Nintendo's original forecast. At least 1.2 million of them were sold in the U.S. Some industry reporters referred to it as "the Tickle Me Elmo of 2004". In June 2005, Nintendo informed the press that a total of 6.65 million units had been sold worldwide.

As is normal for electronics, some were reported as having problems with stuck pixels in either of the two screens. Return policies for LCD displays vary between manufacturers and regions, however, in North America, Nintendo has chosen to replace a system with fixed pixels only if the owner claims that it interferes with their gaming experience. There were two exchange programs in place for North America. In the first, the owner of the defective DS in question would provide a valid credit card number and, afterward, Nintendo would ship a new DS system to the owner with shipping supplies to return the defective system. In the second, the owner of the defective DS in question would have shipped their system to Nintendo for inspection. After inspection, Nintendo technicians would have either shipped a replacement system or fixed the defective system. The first option allowed the owner to have a new DS in 3–5 business days.

Multiple games were released alongside the DS during its North American launch on November 21, 2004. At launch there was one pack-in demo, in addition to the built-in PictoChat program: Metroid Prime Hunters: First Hunt (published by Nintendo and is a demo for Metroid Prime Hunters, a game released in March 2006). At the time of the "Electric Blue" DS launch in June 2005, Nintendo bundled the system with Super Mario 64 DS.

In Japan, the games were released at the same time as the system's first release (December 2, 2004). In the launch period, The Prince of Tennis 2005 -Crystal Drive- (Konami) and Puyo Puyo Fever (Puyo Pop Fever) (Sega) were released.

Europe
The DS was released in Europe on March 11, 2005, for €149. A small supply of units was available prior to this in a package with a promotional "VIP" T-shirt, Metroid Prime Hunters - First Hunt, a WarioWare: Touched! demo and a pre-release version of Super Mario 64 DS, through the Nintendo Stars Catalogue; the bundle was priced at £129.99 for the UK and €189.99 for the rest of Europe, plus 1,000 of Nintendo's "star" loyalty points (to cover postage). On 23 January 2006, 1 million DS units had been sold in Europe, setting a sales record for a handheld console.

The European release of the DS, like the U.S., was originally packaged with a Metroid Prime Hunters: First Hunt demo. The European packaging for the console is noticeably more "aggressive" than that of the U.S./Japanese release. The European game cases are additionally about 1/4 inch thicker than their North American counterparts and transparent rather than solid black. Inside the case, there is room for one Game Boy Advance game pak and a DS card with the instructions on the left side of the case.

Australia and New Zealand
The DS launched in Australia and New Zealand on February 24, 2005. It retailed in Australia for AU$199 and in New Zealand for NZ$249. Like the North American launch, it includes the Metroid Prime Hunters - First Hunt demo. The first week of sales for the system broke Australian launch sales records for a console, with 19,191 units sold by the 27th.

China
"iQue DS", the official name of the Chinese Nintendo DS, was released in China on June 15, 2005. The price of the iQue DS was 980 RMB (roughly US$130) as of April 2006. This version of the DS includes updated firmware to block out the use of the PassMe device, along with the new Red DS. Chinese launch games were Zhi Gan Yi Bi (Polarium) (Nintendo/iQue) and Momo Waliou Zhizao (WarioWare: Touched!) (Nintendo/iQue). The iQue was also the name of the device that China received instead of the Nintendo 64.

Games available on launch

Promotion 
The system's promotional slogans revolve around the word "Touch" in almost all countries, with the North American slogan being "Touching is good."

The Nintendo DS was seen by many analysts to be in the same market as Sony's PlayStation Portable, although representatives from both companies stated that each system targeted a different audience. Time magazine awarded the DS a Gadget of the Week award.

Nine official colors of the Nintendo DS were available through standard retailers. Titanium-colored units were available worldwide, Electric Blue was exclusive to North and Latin America. There was also a red version which was bundled with the game Mario Kart DS. Graphite Black, Pure White, Turquoise Blue, and Candy Pink were available in Japan. Mystic Pink and Cosmic Blue were available in Australia and New Zealand. Japan's Candy Pink and Australia's Cosmic Blue were also available in Europe and North America through a Nintendogs bundle, although the colors are just referred to as pink and blue; however, these colors were available only for the original style Nintendo DS; a different and more-limited set of colors were used for the Nintendo DS Lite.

Sales 

As of March 31, 2016, all Nintendo DS models combined have sold 154.02 million units, making it the best-selling handheld game console to date, and the second best-selling video game console of all time.

Legacy 

The success of the Nintendo DS introduced touchscreen controls and wireless online gaming to a wide audience. According to Damien McFerran of Nintendo Life, the "DS was the first encounter many people had with touch-based tech, and it left an indelible impression."

The DS established a large casual gaming market, attracting large non-gamer audiences and establishing touchscreens as the standard controls for future portable gaming devices. According to Jeremy Parish, writing for Polygon, the Nintendo DS laid the foundations for touchscreen mobile gaming on smartphones. He stated that the DS "had basically primed the entire world for" the iPhone, released in 2007, and that the DS paved the way for iPhone gaming mobile apps. However, the success of the iPhone "effectively caused the DS market to implode" by the early 2010s, according to Parish.

The DS also enlarged the market for female gamers. According to Nintendo in 2006, 44% of DS owners were female, with the majority of Nintendogs owners being female.

The success of the DS paved the way for its successor, the Nintendo 3DS, a handheld gaming console with a similar dual-screen setup that can display images on the top screen in stereoscopic 3D.

On January 29, 2014, Nintendo announced that Nintendo DS games would be added to the Wii U's Virtual Console, with the first game, Brain Age: Train Your Brain in Minutes a Day!, being released in Japan on June 3, 2014.

Hardware 

The Nintendo DS design resembles that of the multi-screen games from the Game & Watch line, such as Donkey Kong and Zelda, which was also made by Nintendo.

The lower display of the Nintendo DS is overlaid with a resistive touchscreen designed to accept input from the included stylus, the user's fingers, or a curved plastic tab attached to the optional wrist strap. The touchscreen lets users interact with in-game elements more directly than by pressing buttons; for example, in the included chatting software, PictoChat, the stylus is used to write messages or draw.

The handheld features four lettered buttons (X, Y, A, B), a directional pad, and Start, Select, and Power buttons. On the top of the device are two shoulder buttons, a game card slot, a stylus holder and a power cable input. The bottom features the Game Boy Advance game card slot. The overall button layout resembles that of the Super Nintendo Entertainment System controller. When using backward compatibility mode on the DS, buttons X and Y and the touchscreen are not used as the Game Boy Advance line of systems do not feature these controls.

It also has stereo speakers providing virtual surround sound (depending on the software) located on either side of the upper display screen. This was a first for a Nintendo handheld, as the Game Boy line of systems had only supported stereo sound through the use of headphones or external speakers. A built-in microphone is located below the left side of the bottom screen. It has been used for a variety of purposes, including speech recognition, chatting online between and during gameplay sessions, and minigames that require the player to blow or shout into it.

Technical specifications 

The system's 3D hardware consists of rendering engine and geometry engine which perform transform and lighting, Transparency Auto Sorting, Transparency Effects, Texture Matrix Effects, 2D Billboards, Texture Streaming, texture-coordinate transformation, perspective-correct texture mapping, per-pixel Alpha Test, per-primitive alpha blending, texture blending, Gouraud Shading, cel shading, z-buffering, W-Buffering, 1bit Stencil Buffer, per-vertex directional lighting and simulated point lighting, Depth Test, Stencil Test, Render to Texture, Lightmapping, Environment Mapping, Shadow Volumes, Shadow Mapping, Distance Fog, Edge Marking, Fade-In/Fade-Out, Edge-AA. Sprite special effects: scrolling, scaling, rotation, stretching, shear. However, it uses point (nearest neighbor) texture filtering, leading to some titles having a blocky appearance. Unlike most 3D hardware, it has a set limit on the number of triangles it can render as part of a single scene; the maximum amount is about 6144 vertices, or 2048 triangles per frame. The 3D hardware is designed to render to a single screen at a time, so rendering 3D to both screens is difficult and decreases performance significantly. The DS is generally more limited by its polygon budget than its pixel fill rate. There are also 512 kilobytes of texture memory, and the maximum texture size is 1024 × 1024 pixels.

The system has 656 kilobytes of video memory and two 2D engines (one per screen). These are similar to (but more powerful than) the Game Boy Advance's single 2D engine.

The Nintendo DS has compatibility with Wi-Fi. Wi-Fi is used for accessing the Nintendo Wi-Fi Connection, compete with other users playing the same Wi-Fi compatible game, PictoChat or with a special cartridge and RAM extension, browse the internet.

Nintendo claims the battery lasts a maximum of 10 hours under ideal conditions on a full four-hour charge. Battery life is affected by multiple factors including speaker volume, use of one or both screens, use of wireless connectivity, and use of backlight, which can be turned on or off in selected games such as Super Mario 64 DS. The battery is user-replaceable using only a Phillips-head screwdriver. After about 500 charges the battery life starts dropping.

Users can close the Nintendo DS system to trigger its 'sleep' mode, which pauses the game being played and saves battery life by turning off the screens, speakers, and wireless communications; however, closing the system while playing a Game Boy Advance game will not put the Nintendo DS into sleep mode, and the game will continue to run normally. Certain DS games (such as Animal Crossing: Wild World) will also not pause, but the backlight, screens, and speakers will turn off. Additionally, when saving the game in certain games the DS will not go into sleep mode. Some games, such as The Legend of Zelda: Phantom Hourglass, used the closing motion needed to enter sleep mode as an unorthodox way of solving puzzles. Looney Tunes: Duck Amuck is another game that used the closing motion as well, which has a game mode that required the player to close the DS in order to play, helping Daffy Duck hunt a monster with the shoulder buttons.

Accessories 

Although the secondary port on the Nintendo DS does accept and support Game Boy Advance cartridges (but not Game Boy or Game Boy Color cartridges), Nintendo emphasized that the main intention for its inclusion was to allow a wide variety of accessories to be released for the system.

Due to the lack of a second port on the Nintendo DSi, it is not compatible with any accessory that uses it.

Rumble Pak 

The Rumble Pak was the first official expansion slot accessory. In the form of a Game Boy Advance cartridge, the Rumble Pak vibrates to reflect the action in compatible games, such as when the player bumps into an obstacle or loses a life. It was released in North America and Japan in 2005 bundled with Metroid Prime Pinball. In Europe, it was first available with the game Actionloop, and later Metroid Prime Pinball. The Rumble Pak was also released separately in those regions.

Headset 
The Nintendo DS Headset is the official headset for the Nintendo DS. It plugs into the headset port (which is a combination of a standard 3.5 mm (1/8 in) headphone connector and a proprietary microphone connector) on the bottom of the system. It features one earphone and a microphone, and is compatible with all games that use the internal microphone. It was released alongside Pokémon Diamond and Pearl in North America, and Australia.

Browser 

On February 15, 2006, Nintendo announced a version of the cross-platform web browser Opera for the DS system. The browser can use one screen as an overview, a zoomed portion of which appears on the other screen, or both screens together to present a single tall view of the page. The browser went on sale in Japan and Europe in 2006, and in North America on June 4, 2007. Browser operation requires that an included memory expansion pak is inserted into the GBA slot. The DSi has an internet browser available for download from the Nintendo DSi shop for free.

Wi-Fi USB Connector 

This USB-flash-disk-sized accessory plugs into a PC's USB port and creates a miniature hotspot/wireless access point, allowing a Wii and up to five Nintendo DS units to access the Nintendo Wi-Fi Connection service through the host computer's Internet connection. When tried under Linux and Mac, it acts as a regular wireless adapter, connecting to wireless networks, an LED blinks when there is data being transferred. There is also a hacked driver for Windows XP/Vista/7/8/10 to make it function the same way. The Wi-Fi USB Connector was discontinued from retail stores.

MP3 Player 

The Nintendo MP3 Player (a modified version of the device known as the Play-Yan in Japan) was released on December 8, 2006, by Nintendo of Europe at a retail price of £29.99/€30. The add-on uses removable SD cards to store MP3 audio files, and can be used in any device that features support for Game Boy Advance cartridges; however, due to this, it is limited in terms of its user-interface and functionality, as it does not support using both screens of the DS simultaneously, nor does it make use of its touch-screen capability. It is not compatible with the DSi, due to the lack of the GBA slot, but the DSi includes a music player via SD card. Although it stated on the box that it is only compatible with the Game Boy Micro, Nintendo DS and Nintendo DS Lite, it is also compatible with the Game Boy Advance SP and Game Boy Advance.

Guitar grip controller 
The Guitar grip controller comes packaged with the game Guitar Hero: On Tour and is plugged into the GBA game slot. It features four colored buttons like the ones found on regular Guitar Hero guitar controllers for the stationary consoles, though it lacks the fifth orange button found on the guitar controllers. The DS Guitar Hero controller comes with a small "pick-stylus" (which is shaped like a guitar pick, as the name suggests) that can be put away into a small slot on the controller. It also features a hand strap. The game works with both the DS Lite and the original Nintendo DS as it comes with an adapter for the original DS. The Guitar Grip also works with its sequels, Guitar Hero On Tour: Decades, Guitar Hero On Tour: Modern Hits, and Band Hero.

Later models

Nintendo DS Lite

The  is the first redesign of the Nintendo DS. While retaining the original model's basic characteristics, it features a sleeker appearance, larger stylus, longer lasting battery, and brighter screens. Nintendo considered a larger model of the Nintendo DS Lite for release, but decided against it as sales of the original redesign were still strong. It was the final DS to have backwards compatibility with Game Boy Advance games. As of March 31, 2014, shipments of the DS Lite had reached 93.86 million units worldwide, according to Nintendo.

Nintendo DSi 

The  is the second redesign of the Nintendo DS. It is based on the unreleased larger Nintendo DS Lite model. While similar to the previous DS redesign, new features include two inner and outer 0.3 megapixel digital cameras, a larger 3.25 inch display, internal and external content storage, compatibility with WPA wireless encryption, and connectivity to the Nintendo DSi Shop.

The Nintendo DSi XL (DSi LL in Japan) features larger screens, and a greater overall size, than the original DSi. It is the fourth DS model, the first to be available as a pure size variation. It features larger screens with wider view angles, improved battery life, and a greater overall size than the original DSi. While the original DSi was specifically designed for individual use, Nintendo president Satoru Iwata suggested that DSi XL buyers give the console a "steady place on a table in the living room", so that it might be shared by multiple household members.

Software and features

Nintendo Wi-Fi Connection 

Nintendo Wi-Fi Connection was a free online game service run by Nintendo. Players with a compatible Nintendo DS game could connect to the service via a Wi-Fi network using a Nintendo Wi-Fi USB Connector or a wireless router. The service was launched in North America, Australia, Japan & Europe throughout November 2005. An online compatible Nintendo DS game was released on the same day for each region.

Additional Nintendo DS Wi-Fi Connection games and a dedicated Nintendo DS web browser were released afterwards. Nintendo later believed that the online platform's success directly propelled the commercial success of the entire Nintendo DS platform. The Nintendo Wi-Fi Connection served as part of the basis of what would become the Wii. Most functions (for games on both the DS and Wii consoles) were discontinued worldwide on May 20, 2014.

Download Play

With Download Play, it is possible for users to play multiplayer games with other Nintendo DS systems, and later Nintendo 3DS systems, using only one game card. Players must have their systems within wireless range (up to approximately 65 feet) of each other for the guest system to download the necessary data from the host system. Only certain games supported this feature and usually played with much more limited features than the full game allowed.

Download Play is also utilized to migrate Pokémon from fourth generation games into the fifth generation Pokémon Black and White, an example of a task requiring two different game cards and two handheld units, but only one player.

Some Nintendo DS retailers featured DS Download Stations that allowed users to download demos of current and upcoming DS games; however, due to memory limitations, the downloads were erased once the system was powered off. The Download Station was made up of 1 to 8 standard retail DS units, with a standard DS card containing the demo data. On May 7, 2008, Nintendo released the Nintendo Channel for download on the Wii. The Nintendo Channel used WiiConnect24 to download Nintendo DS demos through it. From there, a user can select the demo they wish to play and, similar to the Nintendo DS Download Stations at retail outlets, download it to their DS and play it until it is powered off.

Multi-Card Play 
Multi-Card Play, like Download Play, allows users to play multiplayer games with other Nintendo DS systems. In this case, each system requires a game card. This mode is accessed from an in-game menu, rather than the normal DS menu.

PictoChat 

PictoChat allows users to communicate with other Nintendo DS users within local wireless range. Users can enter text (via an on screen keyboard), handwrite messages or draw pictures (via the stylus and touchscreen). There are four chatrooms (A, B, C, D) in which people can go to chat. Up to sixteen people can connect in any one room.

On Nintendo DS and Nintendo DS Lite systems, users can only write messages in black. However, in the DSi and DSi XL, there is a function that allows the user to write in any colour from the rainbow that cycles through the spectrum, meaning the user cannot choose a color.

PictoChat was not available for the subsequent Nintendo 3DS series of systems.

Firmware 
Nintendo's own firmware boots the system. A health and safety warning is displayed first, then the main menu is loaded. The main menu presents the player with four main options to select: play a DS game, use PictoChat, initiate DS Download Play, or play a Game Boy Advance game. The main menu also has secondary options such as turning on or off the back light, the system settings, and an alarm.

The firmware also features a clock, several options for customization (such as boot priority for when games are inserted and GBA screen preferences), and the ability to input user information and preferences (such as name, birthday, favorite color, etc.) that can be used in games.

Japanese, American, and European consoles support the following languages: English, Japanese, Spanish, French, German, and Italian.

On consoles from mainland China, Chinese replaces Japanese and on Korean consoles, Italian is replaced by Korean.

Games

Compatibility 

The Nintendo DS is backward compatible with Game Boy Advance (GBA) cartridges. The smaller Nintendo DS game cards fit into a slot on the top of the system, while Game Boy Advance games fit into a slot on the bottom. The Nintendo DS, like the Game Boy Micro, is not backward compatible with games made for the original Game Boy and Game Boy Color because the required hardware is not included and the console has physical incompatibility with Game Boy and Game Boy Color games.

The handheld does not have a port for the Game Boy Advance Link Cable, so multiplayer and GameCube–Game Boy Advance link-up modes are not available in Game Boy Advance titles. Only single-player mode is supported on the Nintendo DS, as is the case with Game Boy Advance games played via the Virtual Console on the Nintendo 3DS (Ambassadors only) and Wii U.

The Nintendo DS only uses one screen when playing Game Boy Advance games. The user can configure the system to use either the top or bottom screen by default. The games are displayed within a black border on the screen, due to the slightly different screen resolution between the two systems (256 × 192 px for the Nintendo DS, and 240 × 160 px for the Game Boy Advance).

Nintendo DS games inserted into the top slot are able to detect the presence of specific Game Boy Advance games in the bottom slot. In many such games, either stated in-game during gameplay or explained in its instruction manual, extra content can be unlocked or added by starting the Nintendo DS game with the appropriate Game Boy Advance game inserted. Among those games were the popular Pokémon Diamond and Pearl or Pokémon Platinum, which allowed the player to find more/exclusive Pokémon in the wild if a suitable Game Boy Advance cartridge was inserted. Some of the content can stay permanently, even after the GBA game has been removed.

Additionally, the GBA slot can be used to house expansion paks, such as the Rumble Pak, Nintendo DS Memory Expansion Pak, and Guitar Grips for the Guitar Hero: On Tour series. The Nintendo DSi and the DSi XL have an SD card slot instead of a second cartridge slot and cannot play Game Boy Advance games or Guitar Hero: On Tour. In certain Wii games such as Band Hero, the player can use a Nintendo DS for additional features.

Regional division 
The Nintendo DS is region free in the sense that any console will run a Nintendo DS game purchased anywhere in the world; however, the Chinese iQue DS games cannot be played on other versions of the original DS, whose firmware chip does not contain the required Chinese character glyph images; this restriction is removed on Nintendo DSi and 3DS systems. Although the Nintendo DS of other regions cannot play the Chinese games, the iQue DS can play games of other regions. Also, as with Game Boy games, some games that require both players to have a Nintendo DS game card for multiplayer play will not necessarily work together if the games are from different regions (e.g. a Japanese Nintendo DS game may not work with a North American copy, even though some titles, such as Mario Kart DS and Pokémon Diamond and Pearl versions are mutually compatible). With the addition of the Nintendo Wi-Fi Connection, certain games can be played over the Internet with users of a different region game.

Some Wi-Fi enabled games (e.g. Mario Kart DS) allow the selection of opponents by region. The options are "Regional" ("Continent" in Europe) and "Worldwide", as well as two non-location specific settings. This allows the player to limit competitors to only those opponents based in the same geographical area. This is based on the region code of the game in use.

The Nintendo DSi, however, has a region lock for DSiWare downloadable games, as well as DSi-specific cartridges. It still runs normal DS games of any region, however.

Media specifications 

Nintendo DS games use a proprietary solid state mask ROM in their game cards. The mask ROM chips are manufactured by Macronix and have an access time of 150 ns. Cards range from 8–512 MiB (64 Mib to 4 Gib) in size (although data on the maximum capacity has not been released). Larger cards have a 25% slower data transfer rate than more common smaller cards. The cards usually have a small amount of flash memory or an EEPROM to save user data such as game progress or high scores.

Hacking and homebrew 

In South Korea, many video game consumers exploit illegal copies of video games, including the  DS. In 2007, over 500,000 copies of DS games were sold, while the sales of the DS hardware units was 800,000.

Another modification device called Action Replay, manufactured by the company Datel, is a device which allows the user to input cheat codes that allows it to hack games, granting the player infinite health, power-ups, access to any part of the game, infinite in game currency, the ability to walk through walls, and various other abilities depending on the game and code used.

Notes

References

External links

 

 
Products introduced in 2004
Backward-compatible video game consoles
Handheld game consoles
Regionless game consoles
2000s toys
2010s toys
IQue consoles
Seventh-generation video game consoles
Discontinued handheld game consoles
Spike Video Game Award winners